The 2014 Grand Prix de Denain was the 56th edition of the Grand Prix de Denain cycle race and was held on 17 April 2014. The race started and finished in Denain. The race was won by Nacer Bouhanni.

General classification

References

2014
2014 in road cycling
2014 in French sport